Naval Officer Training Command Newport (or more simply, Officer Training School) is a unit of Naval Education and Training Command, located on Naval Station Newport in Newport, Rhode Island that is responsible to the Chief of Naval Education and Training for the development of civilians, enlisted, and newly commissioned personnel for service in the fleet as Naval Officers. Outside of the requisite physical readiness testing, the programs are academic in nature, and with the exception of the student enrolled in the Naval Science Institute or Officer Candidate School, personnel will come to Officer Training School having already received their commission or warrant.

Enlisted conversion and initial training 
Enlisted personnel who apply, and are selected to directly convert to a commissioned officer will attend one of the first two classes (depending on their duty status) and will then take the followup LDO/CWO Academy.  OCS graduates who are staff officers will also attend ODS.

Direct officer accession

Officer Candidate School 

The United States Navy's Officer Candidate School (abbreviated OCS) provides initial training for officers of the line and select operational Staff Corps communities (Supply and CEC) in the United States Navy.  Qualified U.S. citizens who hold a bachelor's degree meet with an Officer Recruiter and prepare application packages for consideration. Applications are then submitted to specific communities, rather than to OCS directly, who then select individuals for each group.

Candidates will then attend OCS for a twelve weeks of training, consisting of basic military training, physical training and classroom training on the Navy's Officer Professional Core Competencies.

Upon graduation, Candidates will be commissioned as Ensigns (O-1) in the Navy, and will either head to the fleet or to further training.

Naval Science Institute and STA-21 commissioning 

All members selected for the STA-21 program will attend 8 weeks of Naval Science Institute (NSI) as an "Officer Candidate" prior to assignment at an NROTC unit for degree completion and commissioning. The NSI course builds upon previous naval experience and is designed to teach each selectee the fundamental core concepts of officership and the high ideals of a military officer.

Upon completion of NSI, STA-21 selectees are then assigned to the NROTC unit for drill, physical training, and receive two courses in leadership prior to commissioning. They will continue to receive active duty pay and benefits while they are completing their education at the NROTC-affiliated university/college. They must complete the degree within 36 months of assignment.

The largest difference between NROTC Midshipmen and STA-21 NROTC Officer Candidates is that while NROTC Midshipmen are on reserve duty (except during summer annual training), STA-21 Officer Candidates attached to NROTC units will remain on active duty while attending while attending the university.

References 

United States Navy schools and training
Education in Newport County, Rhode Island